The 2017 Travelers Northern Ontario Men's Provincial Championship, the "provincial" men's curling championship of Northern Ontario was held February 8–12 at the Fort William Curling Club in Thunder Bay, Ontario. The winning team  Will represent Northern Ontario at the 2017 Tim Hortons Brier in St. John's, Newfoundland and Labrador.

Teams
Teams are as follows:

Round robin standings

Scores

February 8
Draw 1
Jacobs 7-2 Sayer
Chandler 6-5 Horgan
Burgess 7-4 Hackner
Johnston 6-5 Glibota
Draw 2
Hackner 10-5 Glibota
Burgess 6-5 Johnston
Sayer 5-6 Horgan
Jacobs 7-1 Chandler

February 9
Draw 3
Horgan 8-6 Burgess
Jacobs 9-4 Glibota
Johnston 7-0 Chandler
Hackner 6-1 Sayer
Draw 4
Chandler 6-0 Hackner
Johnston 10-2 Sayer
Burgess 3-8 Jacobs
Glibota 7-5 Horgan

February 10
Draw 5
Johnston 2-8 Jacobs
Horgan 4-8 Hackner
Glibota 7-1 Chandler
Burgess 8-5 Sayer
Draw 6
Sayer 5-12 Chandler
Burgess 5-8 Glibota
Horgan 3-8 Jacobs
Hackner 6-9 Johnston

February 11
Draw 7
Horgan 6-4 Johnston
Jacobs 6-5 Hackner
Glibota 8-2 Sayer
Burgess 9-5 Chandler

Playoffs

Semifinal
Saturday, February 11, 7:30 pm

Final
Saturday, February 11, 7:30 pm

References

2017 Tim Hortons Brier
Curling in Northern Ontario
Travelers Men's NOCA Provincials
Sports competitions in Thunder Bay
February 2017 sports events in Canada